Sea sorrel or in French  can refer to different seaweeds:

 Desmarestia viridis, specifically
 Desmarestia, the entire genus

See also
 Sorrel (disambiguation)
 Sorel (disambiguation)
 Sorell (disambiguation)
 Sorrell (disambiguation)